Ireneusz Mamrot (born 13 December 1970) is a Polish football manager and a former player, currently in charge of I liga club Górnik Łęczna.

Managerial career
Mamrot coached Polish I liga side Chrobry Głogów from 2010 to 2017. He won the III liga Dolnośląsko-lubuska group in 2011 and the II liga west group in 2014, guiding Chrobry from the fourth to second division in 4 years. In June 2017 Mamrot became the new head coach for Jagiellonia Białystok. Despite early success, he was eventually dismissed on 5 December 2019. 

On 9 May 2020, he became the new head coach of Arka Gdynia. He didn't stay at Arka for long, as on 16 December 2020 he was sacked. 

On 7 March 2021, he was announced as the new head coach of ŁKS Łódź. He was released from his duties on 1 June 2021 after a series of poor results, unappealing playing style, losing the dressing room and ŁKS dropping down the table further and further from automatic promotion. 

On 4 June 2021, Mamrot was once again announced as the head coach of Jagiellonia Białystok. He was sacked on 23 December 2021.

On 26 February 2023, Mamrot made his return to managing and took charge of I liga side Górnik Łęczna, replacing Marcin Prasoł.

Honours
Jagiellonia Białystok
Ekstraklasa runner-up: 2017–18
Polish Cup runner-up: 2018–19

Chrobry Głogów
II liga South group winner: 2013–14
III liga Dolnośląsko-Lubuska group winner: 2010–11

References

External links
 Profile at Soccerway
 

1970 births
People from Trzebnica
Living people
Association football midfielders
Polish footballers
III liga players
Polish football managers
Jagiellonia Białystok managers
ŁKS Łódź managers
Arka Gdynia managers
Górnik Łęczna managers
Ekstraklasa managers
I liga managers
II liga managers